"First Blood" is a short story by F. Scott Fitzgerald published in April 1930 in the Saturday Evening Post. It was later collected in the collection Taps at Reveille.

Plot
The story is about teen rebellion and centers on the Perrys, a wealthy family living in Chicago. The young Josephine Perry joins her friend for a trip to see their boyfriends under the guise of seeing a movie. Her love interest is Travis de Coppet, another young WASP. During the course of the evening Travis makes advances towards Josephine and is subsequently rejected. She rejoices at the power she has over men. Throughout the short story she is characterized as beautiful yet jealous. At the close of the story she laments the fact a man she has interest in is out with another girl, all the while she cannot reciprocate another's feelings because she is emotionally truncated. It is the first of the five part "Josephine Perry" stories.

History
The story was published while Zelda's mental health was in a palpable decline. Thus, Fitzgerald began to use the profits from short stories to pay for medical bills. This story was published the same month Zelda Fitzgerald was hospitalized. The title may refer to the breaking of a girl's hymen.

References

Short stories by F. Scott Fitzgerald
Works originally published in The Saturday Evening Post
1930 short stories